League tables for teams participating in Ykkönen, the second tier of the Finnish Soccer League system, in 2004.

League table

Promotion play-offs
Jazz Pori as 13th placed team in the 2004 Veikkausliiga and MIFK Mariehamn as runners-up of the 2004 Ykkönen competed in a two-legged play-off for a place in the Veikkausliiga. MIFK won the play-offs 3-2 on aggregate and were promoted to the Veikkausliiga.

MIFK Mariehamn - Jazz Pori  1-0
Jazz Pori - MIFK Mariehamn  2-2

Relegation play-offs
OLS Oulu - VG-62 Naantali       0-1
VG-62 Naantali - OLS Oulu       3-1

KPV Kokkola - Kraft Närpes      1-1
Kraft Närpes - KPV Kokkola      1-1 aet., 1-4 pen.

KPV Kokkola (formerly also KPV-J Kokkola) were promoted to the Ykkönen and Kraft Närpes relegated to the Kakkonen. KPV Kokkola won 4-1 on penalties.
VG-62 Naantali remained in the Ykkönen after beating OLS Oulu 4-1 on aggregate.

References and sources
 Rec.Sport.Soccer Statistics Foundation
Ykkösen kausi 2004

Footnotes

Ykkönen seasons
2004 in Finnish football
Fin
Fin